Claes Göran Malmberg (born 11 March 1952) is a Swedish former footballer who played as a midfielder.

References

Association football midfielders
Swedish footballers
Allsvenskan players
Malmö FF players
Landskrona BoIS players
1952 births
Living people